Boy Scouts may refer to:
 Boy Scout, a participant in the Boy Scout Movement.
 Scouting, also known as the Boy Scout Movement.
 An organisation in the Scouting Movement, although many of these organizations also have female members. There are thousands of national Scouting organizations or federations, mostly grouped into seven international Scouting associations, along with some non-aligned organizations and Groups. More information on these organizations and groups can be found in:
 List of World Organization of the Scout Movement members
 List of World Association of Girl Guides and Girl Scouts members
 International Union of Guides and Scouts of Europe#Member organizations
 Order of World Scouts#List of members
 World Federation of Independent Scouts#List of members
 World Organization of Independent Scouts#Members
 Confederation of European Scouts#Member organizations
 List of non-aligned Scouting organizations
 The Scouting Movement in a country, see: :Category:Scouting and Guiding by country
 Traditional Scouting
 Scout (Scouting), an age group or section for youth in the range of 11 to 18 years in the Scouting Movement
 That age group or section in an organisation, see: Age groups in Scouting and Guiding

Scouting
Scouting-related lists